Shanmukha Films is an Indian film production and distribution company which started distributing films in 2012 in regions of Andhra Pradesh subsequently got involved in film production. It distributed films like Sardaar Gabbar Singh, Express Raja, Soggade Chinni Nayana, Swamy Ra Ra, Dohchay, Mirchi and Shirdi Sai.

History
Praveen Kumar Varma is the founder of Shanmukha films. After successfully distributing over 50 films in various regions of Andhra Pradesh and Telangana. Shanmukha Films has taken a step forward and started acquiring rights for movies. They started by acquiring Rajinikanth's upcoming movie Kabali, and also acquired complete Telugu rights of film in Andhra Pradesh and Telangana.

Filmography

As Distributors

As Producers

References

Indian companies established in 2012
Mass media companies established in 2012
Film production companies based in Hyderabad, India
2012 establishments in Andhra Pradesh